Juan Valencia may refer to:

 Juan Antonio Valencia (born 1929), Salvadoran Olympic sport shooter
 Juan David Valencia (born 1986), Colombian footballer
 Juanjo Valencia (born 1971), Spanish footballer
 Juan Pablo Valencia (born 1988), Colombian cyclist
 Juan Manuel Valencia (born 1998), Colombian footballer